Thomas Kirkpatrick Monro (1865 – 10 January 1958) was Regius Professor of Medicine and Therapeutics at the University of Glasgow.

He was director of Glasgow Royal Maternity and Women's Hospital, professor of medicine and dean of the Medical Faculty at St Mungo's College, senior editor of the Glasgow Medical Journal, and governor of the Royal Technical College. He also served as a major in the Royal Army Medical Corps.

Monro was also an avid bibliophile, bibliographer and book-collector who amassed an almost complete collection of Sir Thomas Browne and served as the President of the Glasgow Bibliographical Society. The Monro Collection is now held in the special collections of the University of Glasgow Library.

Selected publications
 History of the Chronic Degenerative Diseases of the Central Nervous System (1895).
 Manual of Medicine (1903).
 The Early Editions of Sir Thomas Browne (Records of the Glasgow Bibliographical Society, vol. 7, 1918-1920).
 The Physician as a Man of Letters, Science and Action (1933).

References

External links 
 Glasgow University Library Special Collections department blogpost on the Monro Collection.

1865 births
1958 deaths
People from Arbroath
19th-century Scottish medical doctors
20th-century Scottish medical doctors
Scottish bibliophiles
Royal Army Medical Corps officers